The Darwin blind snake (Anilios tovelli)  is a species of snake in the family Typhlopidae. The species is endemic to Australia.

Etymology
The specific name, tovelli, is in honor of G. T. R. Tovell who collected the holotype while serving as a gunner in the Australian armed forces during World War II.

Geographic range
In Australia, A. tovelli is found in the Northern Territory.

Habitat
The preferred natural habitat of A. tovelli is savanna.

Reproduction
A. tovelli is oviparous.

References

Further reading
Cogger HG (2014). Reptiles and Amphibians of Australia, Seventh Edition. Clayton, Victoria, Australia: CSIRO Publishing. xxx + 1,033 pp. .
Hedges SB, Marion AB, Lipp KM, Marin J, Vidal N (2014). "A taxonomic framework for typhlopid snakes from the Caribbean and other regions (Reptilia, Squamata)". Caribbean Herpetology (49): 1-61. (Anilios tovelli, new combination).
Loveridge A (1945). "A New Blind Snake (Typhlops tovelli) from Darwin, Australia". Proceedings of the Biological Society of Washington 58: 111–112. (Typhlops tovelli, new species).
Wallach V (2006). "The Nomenclatural Status of Australian Ramphotyphlops (Serpentes: Typhlopidae)". Bulletin of the Maryland Herpetological Society 42 (1): 8-24. (Austrotyphlops tovelli, new combination, p. 13).
Wilson, Steve; Swan, Gerry (2013). A Complete Guide to Reptiles of Australia, Fourth Edition. Sydney: New Holland Publishers. 522 pp. .

Anilios
Reptiles described in 1945
Snakes of Australia